Mitte is the first and most central borough of Berlin. The borough consists of six sub-entities: Mitte proper, Gesundbrunnen, Hansaviertel, Moabit, Tiergarten and Wedding.

It is one of the two boroughs (the other being Friedrichshain-Kreuzberg) which were formerly divided between East Berlin and West Berlin. Mitte encompasses Berlin's historic core and includes some of the most important tourist sites of Berlin like the Reichstag and Berlin Hauptbahnhof, Checkpoint Charlie, Museum Island, the TV tower, Brandenburg Gate, Unter den Linden, Potsdamer Platz, Alexanderplatz, the latter six of which were in former East Berlin.

Geography

Mitte (German for "middle", "centre") is located in the central part of Berlin along the Spree River. It borders on Charlottenburg-Wilmersdorf in the west, Reinickendorf in the north, Pankow in the east, Friedrichshain-Kreuzberg in the southeast, and Tempelhof-Schöneberg in the southwest.

In the middle of the Spree lies Museum Island (Museumsinsel) with its museums and Berlin Cathedral (Berliner Dom). The central square in Mitte is Alexanderplatz with the prominent Fernsehturm (TV tower), Germany's highest building, and the large railway station with connections to many subway (U-Bahn), tramway (Berlin trambahn), city trains (S-Bahn) and buses.

There are some important streets which connect Mitte with the other boroughs, e.g. the boulevard Unter den Linden which connects Alexanderplatz to the west with Brandenburg Gate and runs further as Straße des 17. Juni to the Victory Column and the centre of former West Berlin in Charlottenburg, or Karl-Marx-Allee from Alexanderplatz to Friedrichshain and the eastern suburbs.

History

The former Mitte district had been established by the 1920 Greater Berlin Act and comprised large parts of the historic city around Alt-Berlin and Cölln. Brandenburg Gate was the western exit at the Berlin city boundary until 1861.

Between 1961 and 1990, the area's East Berlin portion was surrounded by the Berlin Wall on the north, south and west. There were some border control points, the most notable of which was Checkpoint Charlie between Kreuzberg and Mitte, which was operated by the United States Army and was open to foreigners and diplomats.

Two other checkpoints were at Heinrich-Heine-Straße/Prinzenstraße east of Checkpoint Charlie, open to citizens of West Germany and West Berlin and on Invalidenstraße in the north on the border with the West Berlin Tiergarten district (the present-day Moabit locality).

Regierungsviertel (Government District) 
The government district is located in the locality of Tiergarten around the Reichstag Building. Most institutions of the German government have their seat at the Regierungsviertel 
 Bundestag, the German parliament in the old Reichstag Building
 Bellevue Palace, seat of the Federal President 
 German Chancellery
 Offices of the Abgeordneten, members of the parliament, in the Paul-Löbe-Haus and the Marie-Elisabeth-Lüders-Haus
 Federal Ministry of the Interior

Botschaftsviertel (Embassy Quarter) 
Many embassies and the Federal Ministry of Defence in the historic embassy quarter in the south of the Tiergarten Park.

Tiergarten Park 
Großer Tiergarten is the name of the biggest urban park in Mitte, located in the same-named locality. Tiergarten Park was established as a hunting ground in the 16th century by the Prussian kings. Today it is enclosed by densely built-up areas by Hansaviertel and Moabit in the north, the Government District in the east and the City West and the Embassy Quarter in the southwest.

Many cultural monuments and memorials are located in the Tiergarten Park, like the Siegessäule, the Soviet War Memorial and a historic rose garden. The Memorial to the Murdered Jews of Europe, the biggest victim group of the Nazi dictatorship, is located on the east side of the park, near the Brandenburg Gate and near the place where Hitler's New Reich Chancellery once was.

Kulturforum 
The Kulturforum was built in the 1950s and 1960s at the edge of West Berlin, after most of the once unified city's cultural assets had been lost behind the Berlin Wall. The Kulturforum is characterized by its innovative modernist architecture; several buildings are distinguished by the organic designs of Hans Scharoun, and the Neue Nationalgalerie was designed by Mies van der Rohe, albeit originally as a private house.

Among the cultural institutions housed in and around the Kulturforum are:
 Neue Nationalgalerie
 Gemäldegalerie
 Museum of Decorative Arts
 Musical Instrument Museum
 Kupferstichkabinett (Print room)
 Art Library
 Berliner Philharmonie
 Chamber Music Hall
 Berlin State Library
 Ibero-American Institute
 Wissenschaftszentrum
 St. Matthäus-Kirche

In arts and literature 
Berlin Alexanderplatz, a 1929 novel by Alfred Döblin
Mitte 1, a 2013 novel by Albrecht Behmel
 Berlin-Mitte, Norman Ohler
 Unter diesem Einfluss, Henning Kober

Subdivision

The present-day borough of Mitte consists of six localities:

Demographics
, the borough had a population of 322,919, of whom 144.000 (44.5%) had a migration background. In the former West Berlin areas of  Wedding, Gesundbrunnen and Moabit, foreigners and Germans of foreign origin compose nearly 70% of the population, while in Mitte proper the share of migrants is relatively low. The immigrant community is quite diverse, however, Turks, Africans, Eastern Europeans  and East Asians form the largest groups.

Politics

Borough assembly
The governing body of Mitte is the borough assembly (Bezirksverordnetenversammlung). It has responsibility for passing laws and electing the borough administration, including the mayor. The most recent borough assembly election was held on 26 September 2021, and led to a coalition between the Greens and the social democrats.

The 2021 results were as follows:

! colspan=2| Party
! Lead candidate
! Votes
! %
! +/-
! Seats
! +/-
|-
| bgcolor=| 
| align=left| Alliance 90/The Greens (Grüne)
| align=left| Laura Neugebauer
| 44,653
| 28.5
|  4.6
| 18
|  4
|-
| bgcolor=| 
| align=left| Social Democratic Party (SPD)
| align=left| Ephraim Gothe
| 28,997
| 18.5
|  5.3
| 12
|  2
|-
| bgcolor=| 
| align=left| The Left (LINKE)
| align=left| Christoph Keller
| 26,256
| 16.8
|  1.1
| 10
| ±0
|-
| bgcolor=| 
| align=left| Christian Democratic Union (CDU)
| align=left| Carsten Spallek
| 20,088
| 12.8
|  0.7
| 8
|  1
|-
| bgcolor=| 
| align=left| Free Democratic Party (FDP)
| align=left| Bastian Roet
| 10,419
| 6.7
|  0.6
| 4
|  1
|-
| bgcolor=| 
| align=left| Alternative for Germany (AfD)
| align=left| Sabine Schüler
| 7,565
| 4.8
|  5.1
| 3
|  2
|-
| colspan=8 bgcolor=lightgrey|
|-
| bgcolor=| 
| align=left| Volt Germany
| align=left| 
| 3,668
| 2.3
| New
| 0
| New
|-
| bgcolor=| 
| align=left| Tierschutzpartei
| align=left| 
| 3,410
| 2.2
| New
| 0
| New
|-
| bgcolor=| 
| align=left| Die PARTEI
| align=left| 
| 3,358
| 2.1
| New
| 0
| New
|-
| bgcolor=| 
| align=left| dieBasis
| align=left| 
| 2,193
| 1.4
| New
| 0
| New
|-
| bgcolor=| 
| align=left| Klimaliste
| align=left| 
| 1,927
| 1.2
| New
| 0
| New
|-
| 
| align=left| The Greys
| align=left| 
| 1,112
| 0.7
| New
| 0
| New
|-
| bgcolor=| 
| align=left| Pirate Party Germany
| align=left| 
| 919
| 0.6
|  2.9
| 0
|  2
|-
| bgcolor=| 
| align=left| Free Voters
| align=left| 
| 903
| 0.6
| New
| 0
| New
|-
| bgcolor=| 
| align=left| The Humanists
| align=left| 
| 602
| 0.4
| New
| 0
| New
|-
| bgcolor=| 
| align=left| Ecological Democratic Party
| align=left| 
| 287
| 0.2
| New
| 0
| New
|-
| 
| align=left| The Eligible
| align=left| 
| 99
| 0.1
| New
| 0
| New
|-
! colspan=3| Valid votes
! 156,456
! 99.1
! 
! 
! 
|-
! colspan=3| Invalid votes
! 1,384
! 0.9
! 
! 
! 
|-
! colspan=3| Total
! 157,840
! 100.0
! 
! 55
! ±0
|-
! colspan=3| Electorate/voter turnout
! 247,338
! 63.8
!  10.0
! 
! 
|-
| colspan=8| Source: Elections Berlin
|}

Borough government
The borough mayor is elected by the borough assembly, and positions in the borough administration are apportioned based on party strength. Stefanie Remlinger of the Greens was elected mayor on 20 October 2022. Since the 2021 municipal elections, the composition of the borough administration is as follows:

Twin towns – sister cities

Mitte is twinned with:

 Beyoğlu (Istanbul), Turkey (2008)
 Bottrop, Germany (1983)
 Central AO (Moscow), Russia (2006)
 Chaoyang (Beijing), China (2004)
 Chiyoda (Tokyo), Japan (1994)
 Frogn, Norway (1990)
 Higashiōsaka, Japan (1959)
 Holon, Israel (1970)
 Kassel, Germany (1979)
 Petrogradsky (Saint Petersburg), Russia (1994)
 Schwalm-Eder-Kreis, Germany (1992)
 Shinjuku (Tokyo), Japan (1994)
 Tourcoing, France (1995)
 Tsuwano, Shimane, Japan (1995)

Gallery

See also

Berlin-Mitte (electoral district)

References

External links

Official homepage 
Official homepage of Berlin 

 
Districts of Berlin
Central business districts
2001 establishments in Germany